Mushkan or Mooshkan may refer to:
 Mushkan, Fars
 Mushkan, Ilam